Podnart is a village in the Municipality of Radovljica in the Upper Carniola region of Slovenia.

Name
Podnart was attested in written sources in 1763–87 as Podnart and Podnarth. The name is a fused prepositional phrase that has lost case inflection, from pod 'below' + nart 'end of a mountain chain, level area between mountains and a valley'. In this case, it refers to the settlement's location below the hills between the Sava River and Lipnica Creek.

References

External links

Podnart at Geopedia
Village Community web site

Populated places in the Municipality of Radovljica